Mix is the debut studio album by New Zealand pop rock band Stellar, released by Sony BMG on 29 July 1999. The album debuted at No. 2 on the RIANZ albums chart, and after seven weeks within the top ten, reached number one. The album was certified 5× platinum, after selling over 75,000 copies in New Zealand.

The album was re-released on 18 February 2000 as a limited edition which included new cover art and a bonus CD-Rom that included the music videos for the singles "Part of Me", "Violent" and "Every Girl", as well as three remixes (these had appeared on previous singles) and an 8-minute documentary. All subsequent pressings of the album also featured the new cover.

Mix was the 22nd best-selling album in 2000 in New Zealand. At the New Zealand Music Awards in 2000, Mix won the Album of the Year award.

Track listing

Singles
Five singles were released from the album.

 [1998.11.27] "What You Do (Bastard)"
 [1999.04.26] "Part of Me"
 [1999.07.19] "Violent"
 [1999.11.22] "Undone"
 [2000.04.03] "Every Girl"

References

1999 debut albums
Stellar (New Zealand band) albums